Iacob N. Lahovary (16 January 1846 – 7 February 1907) was a member of the Romanian aristocracy, a general, politician and diplomat who served as the Minister of War and Minister of Foreign Affairs of the Kingdom of Romania.

Life and career
Iacob Lahovary was the brother of Alexandru Lahovary and Ioan Lahovary both of whom served as foreign ministers. He attended the Bucharest School of Officers in 1859–1864, École Polytechnique in Paris in 1864–1870. He also graduated from Sorbonne University with a degree in mathematics in 1870. As soon as Lahovary entered military service, he quickly rose in the ranks of the Romanian Army: he became second lieutenant in 1864, lieutenant in 1870, captain in 1871, major in 1874, lieutenant colonel in 1877, colonel in 1883, brigadier general in 1891, and general in 1900.

During the Romanian War of Independence of 1877–1878, Lahovary fought at the battle of Vidin and at the Siege of Plevna. His awards include the War Medal of Military Virtue; the Order of the Star of Romania, Commander class; and the Order of Carol I, Grand Officer class.

His first wife was Elena Kretzulescu, with whom he had a daughter, Elena. Divorced in 1883, he remarried Alexandrina Cantacuzino, with whom he had two sons, Iacob and Leon.

He served as Minister of Foreign Affairs for a little more than two years before he died in February 1907 and was replaced by his brother Ioan Lahovary. Lahovary died in Paris of colon cancer. He was buried at Bellu Cemetery in Bucharest, in a tomb designed in 1905 by renowned architect Ion Mincu.

Legacy

His resting place was vandalized in 1993, when his bust (the work of sculptor ) was stolen. In 2008, Marian Vanghelie, the then-Mayor of Sector 5 of Bucharest had Lahovary's remains removed, and his grandfather was buried there, instead.

A street in Galați is named after General Iacob Lahovary.

The  was built by Ion Mincu between 1884 and 1886, at his request. Registered now as a monument istoric, the house is considered to be one of the first significant Romanian Revival style buildings in the history of Romanian architecture.

References

1846 births
1907 deaths
Nobility from Bucharest
Military personnel from Bucharest
École Polytechnique alumni
University of Paris alumni
Romanian military personnel of the Russo-Turkish War (1877–1878)
Chiefs of the General Staff of Romania
Romanian Land Forces generals
Romanian Ministers of Foreign Affairs
Romanian Ministers of Defence
Commanders of the Order of the Star of Romania
Recipients of the Military Virtue Medal
Deaths from colorectal cancer
Deaths in Paris
Burials at Bellu Cemetery